In sports, parity is when participating teams have roughly equivalent levels of talent. In such a league, the "best" team is not significantly better than the "worst" team.  This leads to more competitive contests where the winner cannot be easily predicted. The opposite condition, which could be considered "disparity" between teams, is a condition where the elite teams are so much more talented that the lesser teams are hopelessly outmatched.

Different major governing organizations attempt to achieve financial and/or competitive parity in different ways. For example, the National Football League (NFL) in the U.S. has established the shared revenue plan, in which all teams equally benefit from television revenue and sales of NFL franchised goods. All of the major leagues of North America use a draft system to ensure that the best prospects are allocated to the teams most in need of them. In much of the world outside North America, parity is enforced through promotion and relegation: the weakest teams in a league are forcibly expelled from the league and switch places with the best teams in a lower league.

Many consider the NFL to be the most "fair" or competitive league, with many different teams having a chance to win each year. In the NFL, complete parity would be a state where on any given Sunday, any given team can win any given game. The appearance of parity in the NFL over the course of the entire season may be something of an illusion; the New England Patriots, in particular, were noted for a prolonged dynasty in the 21st century under starting quarterback Tom Brady and head coach Bill Belichick that league policies failed to break up, while their division rivals, the Buffalo Bills, simultaneously suffered through a 17-season playoff drought (though the Bills may have been harmed by Buffalo's small market, high taxes, and poor reputation as a destination city). A franchise may struggle due to ineptitude in talent evaluation, coaching, player development, organizational structure, or overall team and player operations; a league with parity would, in theory, allow such struggling teams to identify and fix these issues while ensuring that a dynasty cannot take hold.

Expansion teams are among the most difficult to bring to parity. Especially in sports where team chemistry is an important factor in success, expansion team players (who consist mostly of cast-offs from other teams) must learn to work as a team before success happens, a process that can take years. Two notable exceptions were the Baltimore Stallions, who reached the Grey Cup in both their seasons in the Canadian Football League (winning the latter appearance); and the Vegas Golden Knights, who reached the Stanley Cup Finals in their inaugural season in the National Hockey League.

An example of disparity in sports is Portuguese Liga, the top-flight professional football (soccer) league in Portugal, where three clubs have accounted for 75 of the 77 championships in league history.

Salary cap limits set a maximum amount of money that may be spent on athletes' contracts. These limits exist to different extents in several other leagues as well. For example, Major League Baseball (MLB) in the U.S. does not have a cap, but charges a luxury tax beyond a certain level.

Another example of disparity would be demonstrated by the NBA from the 2014–15 NBA season to the 2017–18 NBA season, where the Golden State Warriors and Cleveland Cavaliers have been the only franchises to reach the NBA Finals during that specific time span and during the 2017 NBA Finals and the 2018 NBA Finals the Golden State Warriors won 8 out of the possible 9 finals games.

Prolonged disparity can be severely detrimental to a sports league. The All-America Football Conference collapsed in part because one of its teams, the Cleveland Browns, dominated the league throughout its four-year existence.

See also 
 List of highest paid Major League Baseball players
 List of largest sports contracts
 Freak show fights in mixed martial arts
 Balance of performance (BoP) in auto racing

References 

Sports terminology